Stizocera spinicornis is a species of beetle in the family Cerambycidae. It was described by Fairmaire in 1864.

References

Stizocera
Beetles described in 1864